Ueli Bodenmann (born 14 March 1965 in St. Gallen) is a Swiss rower. He is 191 cm tall and lives in Wilen, Switzerland. Bodenmann is a member of Rorschach SC.

References 
 
 

1965 births
Living people
Swiss male rowers
Sportspeople from St. Gallen (city)
Olympic rowers of Switzerland
Rowers at the 1988 Summer Olympics
Rowers at the 1992 Summer Olympics
Rowers at the 1996 Summer Olympics
Olympic silver medalists for Switzerland
Olympic medalists in rowing
World Rowing Championships medalists for Switzerland
Medalists at the 1988 Summer Olympics